The professional support lawyer (PSL) position, also known as knowledge lawyer (KL), has its origins in the United Kingdom and is essentially a central resource for research within a given practice area. PSLs primarily operate in large law firms and support the wider division through provision of key cases, legislation and practical working knowledge, thereby reducing the amount of research time needed to deal with matters. The PSL is usually a senior position (at the senior associate or partner level). Apart from practical guidance, PSLs also involve themselves with support functions such as case strategy.

Specific roles
The PSL role may also include new firm-wide role elements such as:
 Know-how, precedents and standard forms: drafting, updating, managing and disseminating documents, setting up or dealing with online document systems.
 Research: analysing new law and practice, researching points of law or directing fee earners to appropriate sources.
 Training: organising internal lectures or seminars for trainees, solicitors groups or firm-wide. Dealing with external training, building up relationships with speakers and event-support.
 Marketing and business development: producing newsletters for clients, arranging or assisting in marketing events, arranging client seminars.
 Information technology: working on IT-specific projects such as setting up Internet dealrooms, creating and updating websites, and developing a firm's information/knowledge base and/or Intranet.
 Dealing with fee earner enquiries: answering queries relating to maintained information, new areas of law, and complex areas of law or specialisms.

References

British lawyers